Edward Harrison Leslie (born April 21, 1957) is an American retired professional wrestler, best known for his work in the World Wrestling Federation (WWF) under the ring name Brutus "The Barber" Beefcake. He later worked for World Championship Wrestling (WCW) under a wide variety of names.

Leslie held nine titles throughout his career, and is a former WWF World Tag Team Champion with Greg Valentine. He also competed for major singles titles on pay-per-view and television, headlining the Starrcade 1994, in a match against then-WCW World Heavyweight Champion Hulk Hogan. Leslie was inducted into the WWE Hall of Fame class of 2019 by Hogan.

Professional wrestling career

Early career (1977–1984)
Leslie began his career at the side of Terry Bollea in 1977. At the time, the two were billed as brothers. Leslie was Ed Boulder when Bollea wrestled as "Terry Boulder", and Dizzy Hogan when Bollea became "Hulk Hogan". In later years this created confusion among fans, many of whom actually believed that Leslie and Bollea were real life brothers. Leslie briefly wrestled in Bill Watts' Mid-South territory and in the World Wrestling Federation (WWF) in 1980. In a 2000 shoot interview, he recalled his first match was a tag match with Ron Slinker, against Ox Baker and Eric the Red.

World Wrestling Federation (1984–1993)

The Dream Team (1984–1987)

Leslie rejoined the WWF as a heel named Brutus Beefcake in late 1984, managed by "Luscious" Johnny Valiant. Introduced in a vignette that portrayed him as a male stripper, Beefcake was a vain character who dressed in outlandish outfits. As a singles wrestler, he feuded with David Sammartino whom he fought to a double DQ at the inaugural WrestleMania at Madison Square Garden, and WWF World Heavyweight Champion Hulk Hogan. Hogan sought revenge on Beefcake after he and Valiant injured Hogan's protégé, Hillbilly Jim (at a show in San Diego in February 1985), Hillbilly had appeared in Hogan's corner for a match between Hogan and Beefcake. In the summer of 1985, Beefcake began teaming with Greg "The Hammer" Valentine. They became known as The Dream Team. They soon began challenging The U.S. Express (Mike Rotundo and Barry Windham) for the WWF Tag Team Championship. Initially, the U.S. Express successfully met these challenges but, at the August 24 show in the Philadelphia Spectrum, The Dream Team won the titles after Beefcake rubbed Valiant's lit cigar into Windham's eye. They defended the belts for eight months, primarily from a reformed U.S. Express (Dan Spivey replaced the departed Windham) and The British Bulldogs. At WrestleMania 2, in Rosemont, Illinois, The Dream Team lost the title to The British Bulldogs. They were unsuccessful in rematches for the title and soon dropped to mid-card status.

The Barber (1987–1990)
The Dream Team broke up at WrestleMania III. After defeating The Rougeau Brothers at the pay-per-view, the team had an argument and Beefcake was left in the ring while Valentine and Valiant left with Dino Bravo. This provided the impetus for Beefcake to turn face. In the immediate next match on the show, Beefcake helped Roddy Piper to defeat Adrian Adonis, reviving Piper after Adonis had rendered him unconscious. Per match stipulations, Adonis would have his head shaved. Beefcake undertook this task and earned the nickname "The Barber". Thereafter, Beefcake started bringing garden shears (with the handles taped to resemble barber poles) to the ring, and using a sleeper hold (hitherto a speciality of both Piper and Adonis, used heavily by both in their WrestleMania III match) as his finishing move. After a match, he would strut around the ring, "snipping" his fingers like scissors to indicate he was about to cut his defeated opponent's hair. As he did (using either his shears or an electric razor) he would throw handfuls of hair into the air for the amusement of his fans.

After coming out on top of a feud with former partner Valentine and ex-manager Valiant, Beefcake feuded with Intercontinental Heavyweight Champion The Honky Tonk Man. Beefcake vowed to not only win the title, but put Honky to sleep and cut his duck's tail. Beefcake never made good on that vow, since Honky got himself disqualified from most of their matches (wrestling titles generally do not change hands on a disqualification). Honky often had assistance from a mysterious pig-tailed and sunglassed blonde named Peggy Sue (WWF Women's Champion Sherri Martel usually played this character during television tapings and PPV events, but at house shows "she" was Jimmy Hart in drag). Beefcake countered with a "woman" of his own: "Georgina" (George "The Animal" Steele in drag). The feud concluded at WrestleMania IV, where Honky was again disqualified, after interference from Hart. Though Honky escaped with the title and his hair, Beefcake caught Hart towards the end of the match and humiliated him with a partial haircut.

Beefcake also feuded with "Outlaw" Ron Bass in 1988, beginning when Bass attacked him after a match on Superstars of Wrestling, lacerating his head with a spur. As a result, the injured Beefcake missed his scheduled Intercontinental Heavyweight Championship match against The Honky Tonk Man at the first SummerSlam event on August 29. He ultimately defeated Bass in a grudge match on Saturday Night's Main Event XIX. He then had a feud with Randy Savage during 1989. On "The Brother Love Show" (an interview segment on WWF Superstars of Wrestling), Beefcake called Savage's new manager, Sensational Sherri, "Scary Sherri," and an angered Savage attacked him and, with the help of Sherri, humiliated him with a haircut. Eventually, the feud became intertwined with one between Hulk Hogan and Zeus (based around the movie No Holds Barred). Hogan was simultaneously involved in his own feud with Savage over the WWF World Heavyweight Title. During his match against Savage, Beefcake was assaulted by Zeus. At SummerSlam, Hogan and Beefcake with their manager, Miss Elizabeth teamed to defeat Savage and Zeus. The rivalry resumed when, on December 27, No Holds Barred was shown as part of a pay-per-view special called "No Holds Barred: The Movie-The Match." In the match portion of the show (taped two weeks earlier in Nashville, Tennessee), Hogan and Beefcake defeated Savage and Zeus in a steel cage match.

At WrestleMania VI, Beefcake became the first person to pin Mr. Perfect on PPV. During the spring and summer of 1990, Beefcake was involved in the Intercontinental Heavyweight Championship tournament and, along with opponent Dino Bravo, were counted-out in the first round. Beefcake was scheduled for a WrestleMania VI re-match, this time for the Intercontinental Heavyweight Championship against Mr. Perfect at SummerSlam.

Parasailing accident and return (1990–1993)

In July 1990, a serious parasailing accident put Leslie out of action. He was helping his parasailer friend prepare for takeoff, when the driver of the boat mistook a cue to take off and pulled the friend's knees hard into Leslie's face, crushing his facial skeleton. Over 100 feet of wire and 32 screws were required to construct a new face. Leslie lost his nasal cavity, jaw, and had no ability to breathe on his own. Leslie's wrestling career was put on hold for almost two years.

For a short time in early 1991, a masked character played by Leslie appeared on TV. The character would run in during matches and attack various heels (notably Rick Martel, Dino Bravo and Earthquake). He would run in on their matches, punch them a few times, throw a headbutt and immediately retreat. He never wrestled a match and was never given an official name. Dave Meltzer at this time reported that most wrestlers were against his return due to concerns about his safety and their ability to have quality matches while avoiding injuring him further. Leslie returned as Brutus Beefcake in a special appearance on the April 23, 1991 episode of WWF Prime Time Wrestling, and then as a full-time regular in the summer of 1991, hosting an interview segment called "The Barber Shop." The Rockers split up on The Barber Shop when Shawn Michaels superkicked partner Marty Jannetty and threw him through a plate glass window; this turned Michaels heel and began his singles run to stardom. The final Barber Shop segment took place in February 1992. Newly turned heel Sid Justice attacked Beefcake and destroyed the set, building heat for his feud with Hulk Hogan. After this, Beefcake disappeared once again.

In early 1993, Beefcake once again returned to the WWF, appearing on Monday Night Raw. Beefcake's facial injury was used in an angle with Money Inc. (Ted DiBiase and Irwin R. Schyster). In what was billed as Beefcake's "comeback match", he defeated DiBiase on Raw by disqualification when DiBiase and Schyster double-teamed him. Schyster then tried to reinjure Beefcake, hitting him with a steel briefcase. Longtime heel manager (and manager of Money Inc.) Jimmy Hart turned face by trying to stop his team from hurting Beefcake, and Hulk Hogan returned to the WWF after a one-year hiatus. Hogan and Beefcake teamed for the first time since December 1989, as The Mega-Maniacs, with Hart as their manager. The Mega-Maniacs (with Beefcake wearing a protective facemask) challenged Money Inc. for the Tag Team Championship at WrestleMania IX. and, though gaining some revenge, lost via disqualification. WrestleMania IX was Leslie's final wrestling appearance on WWF television, although he remained active on the house show circuit. He teamed with Hogan in multiple matches against Money Inc. in June 1993, winning by disqualification. He also defeated Masa Saito on May 3 in Fukuoka, Japan. Following a final tour of Europe from July 9 to August 6, (defeating Terry Taylor in eight straight matches), Leslie left the WWF.

Independent circuit (1993–1997)
After leaving WWF, Beefcake wrestled for a few appearances in New Japan Pro-Wrestling. On April 16, 1994 Beefcake defeated Nailz for the WWWA Heavyweight Title. Then on April 13, 1996 he defeated Jim Neidhart for IPWA. He lost to his former tag partner Greg Valentine on May 31, 1997 for Wrestling International Pro.

World Championship Wrestling (1994–1996)

Three Faces of Fear and various gimmicks 
In 1994, Leslie debuted in World Championship Wrestling (WCW). At first, he only made short appearances with Hulk Hogan, who referred to him as Brother Bruti (as he did when they were WWF tag team partners in 1989 and 1993). At that year's Halloween Havoc, following Hogan's cage match victory over Ric Flair, Leslie was revealed as the masked man who had attacked Hogan just before his title match with Flair at Clash of the Champions XXVIII. Leslie subsequently became The Butcher, and formed The Three Faces of Fear with Kevin Sullivan and Avalanche. The Butcher-Hogan feud culminated in a WCW World Heavyweight title match at Starrcade, which The Butcher lost.

The Butcher continued wrestling for some time after The Three Faces of Fear broke up in May 1995, then became amnesic, as The Man with No Name. Leslie rejoined Sullivan in his new stable The Dungeon of Doom, as The Zodiac, a character wearing black and white face paint and only ever saying, "Yes, no, yes, no!" The Dungeon of Doom feuded with Hogan for most of the remainder of 1995. Hogan eventually turned Zodiac against his stablemates by revealing him as a mole. After leaving The Dungeon of Doom, Leslie became The Booty Man, and his gimmick was that of a man infatuated with his own buttocks, shaking them on the way to the ring and during matches. His signature move was a high knee (a homonym of "hiney"). He was accompanied to the ring by Kimberly Page (who became known as The Booty Babe), and feuded with Diamond Dallas Page (at the time, Kimberly's real-life husband). The Booty Man, like Leslie's other WCW gimmicks, did not last long. When the nWo started, he attempted to join by wearing an nWo shirt and presenting a birthday cake to Hollywood Hogan after the latter won the WCW World Heavyweight Championship at WCW Hog Wild, but was instead attacked by Scott Hall, Kevin Nash and Hogan. Leslie then left WCW in December 1996. He continued to work in the independents.

Return to WCW (1998–1999)

The Disciple 
In the final segment of the February 23, 1998 edition of Monday Nitro, Leslie returned as The Disciple, the bodyguard of Hollywood Hogan. He was almost unrecognizable at first, with a full beard, sunglasses, and nWo-styled biker attire. His true identity was later revealed onscreen by Roddy Piper, during his feud with Hogan. The Disciple accompanied Hogan to the ring for his matches, and would often be called on to assist in beating down an opponent, often using his new finishing move, "The Apocalypse". After Hogan became the WCW World Heavyweight Champion in April, these beatdowns often included the title belt itself, which The Disciple would drape over his shoulder before performing The Apocalypse, driving its centerplate into the victim's face on the way down.

The Disciple was abducted by The Warrior during Warrior's feud with Hogan, and was later seen hanging from his feet backstage. After being brainwashed by The Warrior, he turned on Hogan and became the second member of Warrior's One Warrior Nation. After Warrior left WCW, The Disciple's push largely diminished and he spent the remainder of his time in WCW as a jobber. His last WCW PPV match was the World War 3 battle royal on November 22, 1998. In his final televised match, aired on the November 6, 1999 WCW Worldwide, he wore attire much like he did in his early WWF days as Brutus Beefcake (though still under the Disciple ring name) as he lost to Hacksaw Jim Duggan.

Later Career (2000–2016)

In May 2000, Beefcake wrestled for the Extreme Wrestling Federation, in a match against Rex Diamond. On June 30, 2000 he lost to The Barbarian in a hardcore match for i-Generation Superstars of Wrestling in Australia. After retiring, Leslie became part of the Christian wrestling group, World Impact Wrestling. He also started a wrestling school. He made an appearance at Pro Wrestling Syndicate's debut show in Garfield, New Jersey on June 24, 2007. He has appeared at several Memphis wrestling shows, including the 2007 Ultimate Clash of the Legends. Leslie was a coach on Hulk Hogan's Celebrity Championship Wrestling.

On January 26, 2008, Leslie was inducted into the XWF Hall of Fame by Jack Blaze. After it became the LPW Hall of Fame, Blaze honored Beefcake again, on March 26, 2010, in Wheeling, West Virginia. On July 24, 2009, Leslie competed in "Celebrity Boxing 10" in Philadelphia, losing in the first round to local competitive eater Bill "El Wingador" Simmons. He took part in the Hulkamania: Let The Battle Begin tour in late 2009, wrestling across Australia, including Perth and Sydney.

On August 28, 2010, Beefcake wrestled for Dynamic Wrestling Alliance, based in Middletown, Ohio. On November 28, 2015, he participates in a real battle to be the contender for the AML Title losing. Being his last match to date, he quietly announced his retirement from professional wrestling.

In June 2016, Beefcake made appearances in Montana for the Big Time Wrestling event. On April 6, 2019 Leslie was inducted into the WWE Hall of Fame class of 2019 by Hulk Hogan.

Personal life

Leslie married Kirsten Georgi on July 1, 1987. They divorced in 1991. He has a daughter, Alana, with Barbara McGondel, who he dated for some time. 

Leslie married Melissa DeGloria in 2013. He has a grandson named Gino, who is a fan of All Elite Wrestling star Jungle Boy.

Legal issues
In February 2004, Leslie caused an anthrax scare at one of Boston's MBTA stations, Downtown Crossing, where he was working at the time. He had left a bag of cocaine in his booth, which a subway rider spotted and assumed to be anthrax. The building was evacuated as a precaution. Leslie checked into a drug rehabilitation facility after admitting that the cocaine was his.

On November 7, 2013, Leslie appeared at Toronto City Hall with a pair of shears and a submarine sandwich, claiming mayor Rob Ford "needed an intervention" in the wake of a high-profile crack cocaine scandal. Leslie offered to be Ford's "angel of mercy", saying "Maybe if he gets his body right, he will be able to get his mind right". Security escorted him from the property when it became apparent that Leslie was attempting to promote a brand of submarine sandwiches. The day before, fellow wrestler The Iron Sheik also tried to visit Ford, and challenge him to an arm-wrestling match.

Championships and accomplishments
Alabama Wrestling Federation
AWF Tag Team Championship (1 time) – with Greg Valentine
Brew City Wrestling
BCW Tag Team Championship (1 time) – with Greg Valentine
Championship Wrestling International
CWI Heavyweight Championship (1 time)
Southeastern Championship Wrestling
NWA Southeastern Tag Team Championship (3 times) – with Ken Lucas (2), and Robert Fuller (1)
International Wrestling Association
IWA Television Championship (1 time)
 Legends Pro Wrestling
 XWF/LPW Hall of Fame Inductee- Class 2008 & 2010
Maple State Wrestling/Slam All-Star Wrestling
MSW/SAW Tag Team Championship (1 time) – with Shane Williams
New England Wrestling Alliance
NEWA Heavyweight Championship (1 time)
World Wide Wrestling Alliance
WWWA Heavyweight Championship (1 time)
World Wrestling Federation / WWE
WWF Tag Team Championship (1 time) – with Greg Valentine
WWE Hall of Fame (Class of 2019)
Pro Wrestling Illustrated
PWI ranked him # 75 of the 500 top singles wrestlers in the PWI 500 in 1995.
PWI ranked him # 173 of the 500 best singles wrestlers of the "PWI Years" in 2003.
PWI ranked him # 94 of the 100 best tag teams of the "PWI Years" with Greg Valentine in 2003.

Lucha de Apuestas record

References

External links

WWE.com – Catching up with Brutus "The Barber" Beefcake. By Brett Hoffman: February 28, 2007

1957 births
American male professional wrestlers
Living people
New World Order (professional wrestling) members
People from Winchester, Massachusetts
Professional wrestlers from Florida
Sportspeople from Middlesex County, Massachusetts
Stampede Wrestling alumni
WWE Hall of Fame inductees
20th-century professional wrestlers